2006 in philosophy

Events

Births

Publications 
 Harry Frankfurt, On Truth (2006)
 Luc Ferry, Learning to Live (2006)
 Paul Boghossian, Fear of Knowledge (2006)
 André Comte-Sponville, The Book of Atheist Spirituality (originally published in French as L'Esprit de l'athéisme, 2006)
 Jonathan Lear, Radical Hope: Ethics in the Face of Cultural Devastation (2006)
 Joshua Foa Dienstag, Pessimism: Philosophy, Ethic, Spirit (2006)
 Roger Crisp, Reasons and the Good (2006)
 Lee Smolin, The Trouble with Physics (2006)

Deaths 
 February 4 - Betty Friedan (born 1921)
 February 13 - P. F. Strawson (born 1919)
 March 27 - Stanisław Lem (born 1921)
 July 8 - Raja Rao (born 1908)
 August 1 - Iris Marion Young (born 1949)

References 

Philosophy
21st-century philosophy
Philosophy by year